Tricholoma cutifractum is an agaric fungus of the genus Tricholoma. Found in the forests of Singapore, it was described as new to science in 1994 by English mycologist E.J.H. Corner.

See also
List of Tricholoma species

References

cutifractum
Fungi described in 1994
Fungi of Asia
Taxa named by E. J. H. Corner